This is the discography of the MPS Records jazz music record label.

Discography

References

Jazz discographies
Record label discographies